Elizabeth Lee (born 1979) is an Australian politician. She has been a Liberal member of the Australian Capital Territory Legislative Assembly since 2016, representing the electorate of Kurrajong. Prior to entering the ACT Legislative Assembly in 2016, Elizabeth was a successful lawyer in the private sector and later a lecturer at the Australian National University and University of Canberra. Having migrated to Australia from Korea at the age of seven, Elizabeth moved to Canberra when she turned 18 to study Law and Asian Studies at The Australian National University.

On 27 October 2020, Lee was elected Leader of the Canberra Liberals and became Leader of the Opposition of the Australian Capital Territory.

Personal life 
Lee was born in Gwangju, South Korea and migrated to Australia in 1986 when she was seven years old. She grew up in Western Sydney and moved to Canberra at 18 to study law and Asian Studies at the Australian National University. She has lived and worked in inner Canberra since 1998.

Lee lives in the inner south with her partner, Nathan, and young daughter, Mia. Outside of politics, she is passionate about fitness, having taught Sh’Bam and Body Balance classes at Fernwood Fitness and ANU Sport.

Career 
She received Bachelors of Law and Asian Studies, a Graduate Diploma in legal practice, and a Masters of Law from the Australian National University, and worked as a law lecturer and solicitor.

Political career 
Lee ran unsuccessfully for the Australian Capital Territory Legislative Assembly in the Molonglo electorate in 2012, and for the Australian House of Representatives seat of Fraser in 2013, both times representing the Liberal Party. She was elected to the Legislative Assembly in 2016 representing the new seat of Kurrajong.

In Alistair Coe's shadow ministry Lee was made Shadow Minister for the Environment, Shadow Minister for Education and Shadow Minister for Disability in December 2016. She was a key advocate for the Canberra Liberals' commitment to achieving net-zero emissions by 2045.

Following the Liberal Party's defeat at the 2020 election, Lee was elected on 27 October 2020 to replace Coe as party leader and Leader of the Opposition. She is the first Asian-Australian to lead a major political party in Australia. In her first year as leader of the Canberra Liberals Lee has pushed for a variety of issues with a particular focus on policy affecting women, the economy, and the environment. In 2021 Lee introduced Australian-first stealthing laws, with criminalised the nonconsensual removal of a condom during sex. She also released an exposure draft for legislation that would mean harsher penalties for perpetrators of domestic violence.

In late 2021, Lee attended the COP26 conference in Glasgow as part of the Australian Coalition for Conservation delegation. She addressed the UN Globe COP26 Legislators Summit closing panel, on how policy makers must set markers for how momentum on climate action can be accelerated from COP26, and also spoke at the Youth Environment Summit in Edinburgh on the importance of young voices on climate.

References

Notes

1979 births
Living people
Liberal Party of Australia members of the Australian Capital Territory Legislative Assembly
Members of the Australian Capital Territory Legislative Assembly
Australian National University alumni
Australian politicians of Asian descent
South Korean emigrants to Australia
21st-century Australian politicians
Women members of the Australian Capital Territory Legislative Assembly
21st-century Australian women politicians